"Wipe Out" is a surf rock instrumental composed by Bob Berryhill, Pat Connolly, Jim Fuller and Ron Wilson. Composed in the form of twelve-bar blues, the tune was first performed and recorded by the Surfaris, who became famous with the single in 1963.

The single was first issued on the independent labels DFS (#11/12) in January 1963 and Princess (#50) in February and finally picked up for national distribution on Dot as 45-16479 in April. Dot reissued the single in April 1965 as 45-144.

The song—both the Surfaris' version as well as cover versions—has been featured in over 20 films and television series since 1964, appearing at least once a decade.

The title of the song is a colloquial surfing term of Southern California. Specifically, a "wipe out" is a fall from a surfboard, especially one that looks painful.

Background
Bob Berryhill, Pat Connolly, Jim Fuller and Ron Wilson wrote "Wipe Out" almost on the spot while at Pal Recording Studio in Cucamonga, California, in late 1962, when they realized they needed a suitable B-side for the intended "Surfer Joe" single. One of the band members suggested introducing the song with a cracking sound, imitating a breaking surfboard, followed by a manic voice babbling, "ha ha ha ha ha, wipe out". The voice was that of the band's manager, Dale Smallin.

Single reception
"Wipe Out" spent four months on the Billboard Hot 100 in the summer of 1963, reaching number 2, behind Stevie Wonder's "Fingertips".  Meanwhile, the original A-side "Surfer Joe", sung by Ron Wilson, only attracted airplay in the wake of "Wipe Out"'s success, peaking at number 62 during its six-week run. "Wipe Out" returned to the Hot 100 in 1966, reaching number 16 on the Hot 100 (and number 63 for the year), peaking at number 9 on the Cash Box chart, selling approximately 700,000 copies in the U.S.  The single spent a grand total of 30 weeks on the Hot 100. Wilson's energetic drum solo for "Wipe Out" (a sped-up version of his Charter Oak High School marching band's drum cadence) helped the song become one of the best-remembered instrumental songs of the period. Drummer Sandy Nelson issued different versions on multiple LPs. In 1970, "Wipe Out" peaked at number 110 on the Bubbling Under Hot 100 Singles chart.

Personnel
 Bob Berryhill – rhythm guitar
 Jim Fuller – lead guitar 
 Pat Connolly – bass 
 Ron Wilson – drums

Charts

In popular culture
Following the 2001 death of television personality Morton Downey Jr., news reports, obituaries and Downey's official website incorrectly credited him as the composer of "Wipe Out".

In science fiction author Robert J. Sawyer's Neanderthal Parallax series, the DNA sequence for a deadly virus is saved in a computer folder entitled "Surfaris". A character immediately recognizes this as a reference to "Wipe Out" and determines that the virus will wipe out all of the Neanderthals on a parallel universe's Earth. She then rewrites the DNA code to a non-lethal version and calls the file "Surfer Joe" in reference to the A-side of "Wipe Out".

In the late 2000s, the track was used on Harry Hill's TV Burp, usually played when Harry or the Knitted Character ride a jelly.

"Wipe Out" has been included in a number of film soundtracks, including those of Dark Star (1974), Dirty Dancing (1987), The Sandlot (1993), Toy Story 2 (1999), Recess: School's Out (2001), The Cat in the Hat (2003), Herbie Fully Loaded (2005), Surf's Up (2007), Far Cry New Dawn (2019), and Stranger Things (2022).

In 2014, the track was played in the 29th episode of season 5 of Regular Show as the "ancient call of the surfers".

The Fat Boys feat. The Beach Boys version

In the summer of 1987, the Fat Boys collaborated with the Beach Boys on a version of "Wipe Out" that made it to number 12 in the U.S. and number 2 in the UK.

Music video 
The music video begins with an announcement of a boxing match with the Fat Boys and Beach Boys in attendance, but the match is interrupted by a fight. In the following scene, the Fat Boys load up a car with swimsuits and then drive off. The Beach Boys are driving a dune buggy through the city. Both bands go around the city in the direction of a beach, while they perform the song and draw the city inhabitants to the beach, where one of the Fat Boys tries to lift a heavy weight and is laughed at by some women. The Beach Boys play DJ in the street.

Track listings 
7" single
 "Wipeout!" - 3:50
 "Fat Boys - Crushin'" - 3:40

12" maxi
 "Wipeout! (Wave I)" - 6:05
 "Wipeout! (Wave II)" - 5:43
 "Fat Boys - Crushin'" (12") - 5:38

Charts

Other cover versions
The Ventures covered "Wipe Out" on their albums Let's Go (1963) and The Ventures on Stage (1965).
The Residents recorded a cover of the song for the album The Third Reich 'n Roll as a part of "Swastikas on Parade".
In 1993, Animal from the Muppets covered the song for the album Muppet Beach Party. Released as a single in 1994, it reached number 38 on the UK Singles Chart. A music video was created to promote the single and the album.

See also
 List of one-hit wonders in the United States

References

1962 songs
1963 debut singles
1987 singles
The Surfaris songs
Jan and Dean songs
The Beach Boys songs
Rock instrumentals
Surf instrumentals
Dot Records singles
PolyGram singles
1960s instrumentals